The 2004–05 Quaid-e-Azam Trophy was one of two first-class domestic cricket competitions that were held in Pakistan during the 2004–05 season. It was the first edition of the Quaid-e-Azam Trophy under a new sponsorship agreement with ABN AMRO signed by the Pakistan Cricket Board. It was contested by eleven regional association teams, with twelve departmental teams contesting the Patron's Trophy later in the season.

The competition was organised as a round-robin qualifying group stage of four-day matches, with the top two teams contesting a five-day final. Group matches took place between 10 October and 24 December 2004, with the final played from 28 December 2004 to 1 January 2005.

Peshawar won the trophy for the second time on the basis of having taken a first-innings lead in the final after the match against Faisalabad resulted in a draw when rain reduced play to just 28 overs during the final two days.

Group stage
The top two teams in the round-robin group stage (highlighted) advanced to the final.

Final

Notes

References

External links
 Series home at ESPN Cricinfo

Domestic cricket competitions in 2004–05
2004 in Pakistani cricket
2005 in Pakistani cricket
Pakistani cricket seasons from 2000–01
2004–05 Quaid-e-Azam Trophy